Dauren Khalidovich Kurugliev (12 July 1992, Makhachkala) is a Russian mixed martial artist and freestyle wrestler of Lezgin descent. He is a 2019 European Games gold medalist and a European champion.

Kurugliev won junior titles including the Russian Junior National Championships in 2011 and the North Caucasian Federal District championships in 2011 and 2013. He competed in the World Cup 2015 in Los Angeles, California and won all three wrestling matches there; he defeated three-time NCAA All-American champion of the Penn State Nittany Lions Wrestling Ed Ruth from the United States (by fall), Usukhbaatar Purevee of Mongolia and Aleksander Gostiev of Azerbaijan. After competing in the American World Cup, he lost in the second round of the 2015 Russian Freestyle Wrestling Championships and so quit his participation there. On 5 July 2015, he lost in the final of the Ali Aliyev Memorial, losing there to Shamil Kudiyamagomedov of Russia.

Kurugliev trains with world champion Abdusalam Gadisov. He is a National Master of Sports in freestyle wrestling.

In 2020, he won the gold medal in the men's 86 kg event at the 2020 Individual Wrestling World Cup held in Belgrade, Serbia.

Championships and accomplishments
2011 Russian Junior Nationals Champion
2012 Golden Grand-Prix Ivan Yarygin Bronze Medalist – 84 kg
2013 Heydar Aliyev Memorial 5th – 84 kg
2013 Ramzan Kadyrov & Adlan Varayev Cup Silver Medalist – 84 kg
2013 Intercontinental Cup 5th – 84 kg
2014 Heydar Aliyev Memorial 10th – 86 kg
2014 Golden Grand-Prix Ivan Yarygin 8th – 86 kg
2014 Memorial Ali Aliyev 10th – 86 kg
2014 Intercontinental Cup Bronze Medalist – 86 kg
2014 Russian National Freestyle Wrestling 5th – 86 kg
2015 Golden Grand Prix Ivan Yarygin Bronze Medalist - 86 kg
2015 Freestyle Wrestling World Cup 4th  – 86 kg
2015 Russian National Freestyle Wrestling 11th – 86 kg
2015 Ali Aliyev Memorial runner-up – 86 kg
2015 Ramzan Kadyrov & Adlan Varayev Cup winner – 86 kg
2015 Intercontinental Cup winner – 86 kg
2016 Golden Grand Prix Ivan Yarygin Bronze Medalist – 86 kg
2017 Golden Grand Prix Ivan Yarygin Gold Medalist – 86 kg
2017 Yasar Dogu international gold medalist – 86 kg
2017 European Wrestling Championships  Gold Medalist – 86 kg
2019 European Games Ggold medalist – 86 kg

References

External links

Living people
Russian people of Lezgian descent
Sportspeople from Makhachkala
1992 births
Russian male sport wrestlers
European Games gold medalists for Russia
Wrestlers at the 2019 European Games
European Games medalists in wrestling
European Wrestling Championships medalists